Paul Skidmore (born July 22, 1956) is an American former professional ice hockey goaltender who played two games in the National Hockey League for the St. Louis Blues.

Awards and honors

References

External links 

1956 births
American men's ice hockey goaltenders
Boston College Eagles men's ice hockey players
Carolina Thunderbirds players
Cincinnati Stingers draft picks
Ice hockey players from New York (state)
Living people
Montana Magic players
Port Huron Flags (IHL) players
Salt Lake Golden Eagles (CHL) players
Salt Lake Golden Eagles (IHL) players
St. Louis Blues draft picks
St. Louis Blues players
Utah Rollerbees players